

Z
 ZBTX - Zalev Brothers Scrap Yard, Windsor, Ontario, Canada
 ZBXU - Zim Israel Navigation Company Limited
 ZCAX - Zinc Corporation of America
 ZCCX - Zeigler Coal Company
 ZCSU - Zim American Israeli Shipping Company Incorporated
 ZDAZ - XTRA Intermodal
 ZIMU - Zim Israel Navigation Company Limited
 ZIPX - Zip Transportation Company
 ZKCC - XTRA Intermodal
 ZMFC - XTRA Intermodal
 ZRNX - Zurn Industries (Erie City Energy Division)
 ZTLX - Ziol Tank Line
 ZTTX - Trailer Train Company
 ZVBX - Ferrous Processing and Trading Company

Z